Skipton  is a town in the Western District of Victoria, Australia. The town is situated on the Glenelg Highway 166 kilometres west of the state capital, Melbourne and 52 kilometres south west of the regional centre, Ballarat. Skipton is in the Shire of Corangamite LGA and is on the banks of Mount Emu Creek. Skipton is named after Skipton, in Yorkshire, England and is known as "the home of the platypus".

History
Skipton was first established in 1839 as a pastoral run and a town site was surveyed in 1852. The town was settled some years later, with a local Post Office opening on the 6th of March 1858. The town held the first agricultural show in the Western District in 1859. Skipton once had a Magistrates' Court, but it closed on the 1st of January 1983.

Culture

Economy
Fine wool is the main agricultural product of the Skipton area. Skipton Variety Market is held on every second Saturday of the month at the Mechanics Hall. A Rose Festival is held on the first Saturday after the running of the Melbourne Cup in November each year.

Sport and recreation
A rail trail allows cyclists to ride between Skipton and Ballarat. Skipton has a football club competing in the Central Highlands Football League. Golfers play at the course of the Skipton Golf Club on Geelong-Skipton Road.

Notable people
 Henry Bolte, the longest serving Premier of Victoria, grew up in Skipton. There is a memorial for Henry Bolte located at the Skipton cemetery, where his parents are buried.
 Henry Kingsley, author and brother of Charles Kingsley, worked on a pastoral station near Skipton for a time in 1857.
 LKS Mackinnon, former chairman of the Victoria Racing Club.
 Silent movie star Claire Adams married the son of LKS Mackinnon, Scobie, and settled at Mooramong homestead near Skipton in 1937.
 Australian Test cricketer Alan Connolly was born in Skipton in 1939.
 The Academy Is... guitarist Michael Guy Chislett was born in Skipton.

References

External links
 
 
Community website
Corangamite Shire Council - Official Site
Ballarat-Skipton rail trail
SMH Travel - Skipton page

Towns in Victoria (Australia)
Shire of Corangamite
Western District (Victoria)